LKP may refer to:
 Communist Party of Latvia, (Latvian ), a former political party in Latvia
 Communist Party of Lithuania,, a former political party in Lithuania
 Lahaina, Kaanapali and Pacific Railroad, Hawaii, USA, reporting mark LK&P
 Lake Placid Airport, New York, USA, IATA code
 Liyannaj Kont Pwofitasyon, Guadeloupe trade union groups
 RNA Helicase A, a human enzyme
 Liberty Korea Party, a political party of South Korea